The Erie Otters are a Major junior ice hockey team based in Erie, Pennsylvania. They are members of the Midwest division of the Ontario Hockey League (OHL), one of only three American teams in the circuit. The team name refers to the North American river otter common to Lake Erie.

History
The Erie Otters were previously located in Niagara Falls, Ontario, known as the Niagara Falls Thunder. They moved to Erie Insurance Arena for the 1996–97 season. After three seasons, they won the Holody Trophy as Midwest Division champions 1999. It was their first of three consecutive Midwest Division championships, culminating in a J. Ross Robertson Cup in the 2001–02 season.  Dave MacQueen won the Matt Leyden Trophy in 2000–01 as the OHL Coach of the Year. General manager Sherwood Bassin was awarded OHL Executive of the Year, and the CHL Executive of the Year for his role in building a championship team. 

The Lake Erie College of Osteopathic Medicine partnered with the Otters in 2012, as their medical provider.

Connor McDavid played for the Otters from the 2012–13 OHL season to the 2014–15 OHL season. Hockey Canada granted McDavid "exceptional player" status, which permitted him to play in the OHL a year earlier than would otherwise be permissible for a player his age. The Otters chose the 15-year-old McDavid as their first overall pick in the 2012 draft. He led the team to the J. Ross Robertson Cup championship finals, where the Otters fell to the Oshawa Generals.

On March 18, 2017, the Otters became the first team in Canadian Hockey League history to record four consecutive 50-win seasons (2013–2017). The Otters had previously shared the record of three consecutive 50-win seasons with the Kelowna Rockets (2012–2015), Edmonton Oil Kings (2011–2014), Saint John Sea Dogs (2009–2012) and the Kamloops Blazers (1989–1992). 

On May 22, 2017, the Otters set a Memorial Cup record for most goals by one team in a single game by defeating the Saint John Sea Dogs with a final score of 12–5, surpassing the previous record of 11 goals set by the Quebec Remparts (1974, 11–3) and Regina Pats (1980, 11–2). Dylan Strome set an individual record of 7 points in a single game (4 goals, 3 assists). Taylor Raddysh also tied the previous record of 6 points (2 goals, 4 assists) in the same game.

On January 17, 2022, the Erie Otters hosted their inaugural Martin Luther King Jr. Day game. The team made history when University of Pittsburgh student Alex Randall broadcast the television feed of the game as the first African American play-by-play announcer in the Ontario Hockey League or the Canadian Hockey League. Theis continued on January 16, 2023 when Arizona State University student Trey Matthews broadcast the television feed of the game as the second African-American play-by-play announcer. The Erie Otters used a Black History Month inspired logo and warm-up jersey on Martin Luther King Jr. Day 2023.

On January 26, 2023, Stan Butler was announced as the 10th head coach in the team's history. The Otters lost by a 5–1 score to the London Knights in Butler's first game as coach.

Uniforms and logos
From their first season until the end of the 2016–17 season, the Erie Otters' colors were navy blue, gold, red, and white. Their primary logo featured a circular outline with a fierce, anthropomorphic otter furnishing a hockey stick and gear. The "Otters" wordmark is superimposed over the design in red with gold and navy blue outline. The team's home uniform included a navy blue sweater with red and gold accents. The away uniforms featured a white jersey with navy blue and red trim.

For the 2013–14 season, the Erie Otters introduced a gold alternate jersey. This jersey features a navy blue shoulder yoke, navy blue and white stripes, and the cursive "Otters" wordmark centered across the chest. The design resembles the sweaters of the defunct Erie Blades, who played from 1975 to 1982. In 2016, the Erie Otters began wearing the gold alternate jerseys for every Saturday home game throughout the regular season and also introduced gold helmets to the uniform set, rather than the blue helmets worn with the gold jersey in previous seasons.

For the 2017–18 season, the Erie Otters announced that the secondary cursive "Otters" watermark has become their new primary logo and the team is making a full-time switch to a gold, navy and white color set. With this change, the alternate gold jerseys have become the new primary home set, and a newly introduced white jersey (in the same style as the gold) has become the new away set.

On May 20, 2019, the Otters updated an older Otters logo with the new color pattern of navy blue and gold as part of the center emblem, shoulder patch with a more modern look and the Erie name inside of the Pennsylvania keystone symbol.

Arena
The Erie Otters play their home games at Erie Insurance Arena, which opened in 1983 and seats 6,716 spectators.

Championships
List of championships:

Coaches
List of coaches:

* indicates replacement mid-season.

Award winners
List of award winners:

General managers
List of general managers with multiple seasons in parentheses.

1998–2015 – Sherwood Bassin (17)
2015–present – Dave Brown (8)

Players

Award winners
List of award winners:

NHL alumni
List of National Hockey League (NHL) alumni:

 Nikita Alexeev
 Brady Austin
 Nick Baptiste
 Adam Berti
 Michael Blunden
 Brad Boyes
 Chris Breen
 David Broll
 Connor Brown
 Andre Burakovsky
 Chris Campoli
 Erik Cernak
 Anthony Cirelli
 Carlo Colaiacovo
 Tim Connolly
 Oscar Dansk
 Alex DeBrincat
 Travis Dermott
 Jamie Drysdale
 Remi Elie
 Warren Foegele
 Brendan Gaunce
 Luke Gazdic
 Justin Hodgman
 Hayden Hodgson
 Mike Liambas
 Brett MacLean
 Kurtis MacDermid
 Mason Marchment
 Connor McDavid
 Greg McKegg
 Steve Montador
 Adam Munro
 Jordan Nolan
 Ryan O'Marra
 Ryan O'Reilly
 Nick Palmieri
 Jeff Paul
 Adam Pelech
 Anthony Peluso
 Geoff Platt
 Darren Raddysh
 Taylor Raddysh
 Michael Rupp
 Dylan Strome
 Stephen Valiquette
 Phil Varone
 Jason Ward
 Jeff Zehr

NHL first round draft picks 
Connor McDavid is the first player with Erie ties to be selected first overall in a major professional sports league’s draft. In his case, it was by the Edmonton Oilers in the 2015 NHL Entry Draft on June 26, 2015.

List of first round NHL draft picks:

Retired numbers
Brad Boyes (#16)
Vince Scott (#18)

Season-by-season results
List of season-by-season results:

Regular season
Legend: OTL - Overtime Loss, SL - Shootout Loss, PTS - Points, GF - Goals For, GA - Goals Against, GD - Goal Differential

Playoffs
List of playoffs results:

Memorial Cup
List of Memorial Cup results:

References

External links
 

Ontario Hockey League teams
Professional ice hockey teams in Pennsylvania
Sports in Erie, Pennsylvania
Ice hockey clubs established in 1996
1996 establishments in Pennsylvania